Coteaux may refer to:

Places
 Côteaux Arrondissement, an arrondissement of the Sud department of Haiti
 Côteaux, Haiti, a commune in the Côteaux Arrondissement of Haiti
 Les Coteaux, Quebec, Canada; a municipality in Vaudreuil-Soulanges
 Les Coteaux, Tobago, Trinidad and Tobago; a village in Tobago, Trinidad and Tobago
 Canton of Les Coteaux, Hautes-Pyrénées, France
 Les Coteaux (Mulhouse), a locality in the city of Mulhouse, Alsace, Grand-Est, France

Other uses
 Prix des Coteaux, a thoroughbred race in Chantilly, France
 Radio Coteaux, a community radio station in Saint Blancard, Gers, Gascony, Occitanie, France

See also

 Coteau (disambiguation)
 Cotes (disambiguation)
 Cote (disambiguation)
 Eau (disambiguation)